Blitzkrieg is a 1981 video game published by Programma International.

Gameplay
Blitzkrieg is a game in which the player shoots down enemy bombers and fighters using an anti-aircraft gun.

Reception
Bob Boyd reviewed the game for Computer Gaming World, and stated that "There are many excellent arcade games on the market today, but I still find myself coming back to Blitzkrieg as one of my abiding favorites."

References

1981 video games
Programma International games